Manfred Reichegger (6 January 1977) is an Italian ski mountaineer, sky runner and mountain runner.

Biography
Reichegger was born in Bruneck. He competed first in ski mountaineering in 1999 and has been member of the national team since 2002. He also won the Mezzalama Skyrace in 2002.

Selected results 
 2002:
 1st, Italian Cup team (together with Dennis Brunod)
 1st, Tour du Rutor (together with Dennis Brunod)
 2nd, Transcavallo (together with Dennis Brunod)
 2003:
 1st, European Championship single race
 1st, European Championship combination ranking
 1st, Italian Cup team (together with Dennis Brunod)
 2nd, European Championship team racing (together with Dennis Brunod)
 2004:
 1st, World Cup team
 1st, Dolomiti Cup team (together with Dennis Brunod)
 2nd, Transcavallo (together with Dennis Brunod)
 3rd, World Championship team racing (together with Dennis Brunod)
 4th, World Championship single race
 4th, World Championship combination ranking
2005:
 1st, European Championship relay race (together with Guido Giacomelli, Dennis Brunod and Matteo Pedergnana)
 1st, Italian Cup team (together with Dennis Brunod)
 1st, Trofeo "Rinaldo Maffeis" (together with Dennis Brunod)
 3rd, World Cup race, Salt Lake City
 5th, World Cup team (together with Dennis Brunod)
 2006:
 1st, World Championship relay race (together with Hansjörg Lunger, Dennis Brunod and Guido Giacomelli)
 1st, World Cup team (together with Dennis Brunod)
 1st, Italian Cup
 1st, Trofeo "Rinaldo Maffeis" (together with Guido Giacomelli)
 1st, Tour du Rutor (together with Dennis Brunod)
 2007:
 1st, European Championship relay race (together with Denis Trento, Dennis Brunod and Guido Giacomelli)
 1st, World Cup team
 1st, Tour du Rutor (together with Dennis Brunod)
 2nd, World Cup single
 2nd, Traça Catalana race
 4th, European Championship team race (together with Dennis Brunod)
 9th, European Championship combination ranking
 2008:
 1st, World Championship relay race (together with Denis Trento, Dennis Brunod and Martin Riz)
 1st, Trofeo "Rinaldo Maffeis" (together with Dennis Brunod)
 5th, World Championship vertical race
 5th, World Championship combination ranking
 6th, World Cup race, Val d'Aran
 8th, World Championship single race
 2009:
 1st, European Championship relay race (together with Lorenzo Holzknecht, Dennis Brunod and Damiano Lenzi)
 1st, Dachstein Xtreme
 2nd, European Championship single race
 2nd, European Championship combination ranking
 3rd, European Championship team race (together with Dennis Brunod)
 4th, European Championship vertical race
 2010
 1st, World Championship relay race (together with Damiano Lenzi, Lorenzo Holzknecht and Dennis Brunod)
 4th, World Championship single race
 4th, World Championship vertical race
 5th, World Championship combination ranking
 6th, World Championship team race (together with Dennis Brunod)
 2nd, Trophée des Gastlosen (ISMF World Cup), together with Dennis Brunod
 2011:
 1st, World Championship relay, together with Robert Antonioli, Denis Trento and Matteo Eydallin
 2nd, World Championship team race, together with Lorenzo Holzknecht
 5th, World Championship single race
 6th, World Championship vertical, combined ranking
 2012:
 1st, European Championship team, together with Lorenzo Holzknecht
 3rd, European Championship relay, together with Matteo Eydallin, Damiano Lenzi and Robert Antonioli
 3rd, World Championship vertical, combined ranking
 4th, European Championship single
 4th, European Championship vertical race
 1st, 2012 Crested Butte Ski Mountaineering Race, sprint, single and total ranking

Trofeo Mezzalama 

 2003: 3rd, together with Dennis Brunod and Nicola Invernizzi
 2005: 3rd, together with Jean Pellissier and Dennis Brunod
 2007: 3rd, together with Dennis Brunod and Denis Trento
 2009: 1st, together with Matteo Eydallin and Denis Trento

Pierra Menta 

 2004: 1st, together with Dennis Brunod
 2009: 1st, together with Dennis Brunod
 2010: 3rd, together with Dennis Brunod
 2011: 5th, together with Damiano Lenzi
 2012: 1st, together with Lorenzo Holzknecht

Patrouille des Glaciers 

 2010: 2nd, together with Matteo Eydallin and Pietro Lanfranchi

References 

1977 births
Living people
Sportspeople from Bruneck
Italian male ski mountaineers
Italian sky runners
World ski mountaineering champions
Ski mountaineers of Gruppo Sportivo Esercito